is an autobahn in northwestern Germany, connecting the cities of Leer and Oldenburg with via Bremen. Originally ending near the city of Delmenhorst, an extension connecting the A 28 to the A 1 has been finished in 2009.

Exit list 

 

|}

External links 

28
A028